Antonio Bonilla Sanmartín (6 December 1882 – 9 November 1937) was a Spanish sport shooter who competed in the 1920 Summer Olympics. He was killed in action during the Spanish Civil War.

In the 1920 Summer Olympics he participated in the following events:

 Team 30 metre military pistol - sixth place
 Team 300 metre military rifle, prone - seventh place
 Team 50 metre small-bore rifle - ninth place
 Team free rifle - eleventh place
 Team 50 metre free pistol - twelfth place
 Team 300 and 600 metre military rifle, prone - twelfth place
 Team 600 metre military rifle, prone - 13th place
 Team 300 metre military rifle, standing - 14th place
 300 metre free rifle, three positions - result unknown
 50 metre small-bore rifle - result unknown

References

External links
List of Spanish shooters

1882 births
1937 deaths
Spanish male sport shooters
ISSF pistol shooters
ISSF rifle shooters
Olympic shooters of Spain
Shooters at the 1920 Summer Olympics
Military personnel killed in the Spanish Civil War